Klimushino is a rural locality (a village) in Korobitsynskoye Rural Settlement, Syamzhensky District, Vologda Oblast, Russia. The population was 39 as of 2002.

Geography 
Klimushino is located 52 km southeast of Syamzha (the district's administrative centre) by road. Goluzino is the nearest rural locality.

References 

Rural localities in Syamzhensky District